The Physics Teacher is a peer-reviewed academic journal published by AIP Publishing on behalf of the American Association of Physics Teachers covering the history and philosophy of physics, applied physics, physics education (curriculum developments, pedagogy, instructional lab equipment, etc.), and book reviews. It was established in 1963 and the current editor-in-chief is Gary White (George Washington University). Paul G. Hewitt is a regular contributor to The Physics Teacher.

See also
 American Journal of Physics
 European Journal of Physics

External links 
 

Monthly journals
American Institute of Physics academic journals
Publications established in 1963
English-language journals
Physics education journals